The Three Leagues, sometimes referred to as Raetia, was the alliance of 1471 of the League of God's House, the League of the Ten Jurisdictions, and the Grey League, leading eventually to the formation of the Swiss canton of Graubünden (Grisons).

The territory corresponds to the core territory of Raetia Curiensis (ruled by the bishops of Chur as Prince-Bishopric of Chur), the early medieval remnant of the Roman province of Raetia prima.

League of God's House

On 29 January 1367, the League of God's House, was founded to resist the rising power of the Bishopric of Chur and the House of Habsburg. Bishop Peter Gelyto reacted by transferring the bishopric to the Habsburgs in exchange for a pension from the ducal house.

The instrument of union was signed by envoys of the cathedral chapter, the episcopal Ministerialis, the city of Chur and the districts of Domleschg, Schams, Oberhalbstein, Oberengadin, Unterengadin and Bergell. Other districts joined the league subsequently, including the Poschiavo in 1408 and the Vier Dörfer in 1450.

For some time, Unterengadin, Münstertal and the upper Vinschgau were disputed between the Bishopric of Chur and the County of Tyrol. While the first two could shake off the rule of the Habsburgs as count of Tyrol, in 1618, Untercalven was separated from the League as the last part of the Vinschgau.

With its capital in Chur, the League was composed of the following districts:
Chur
Bergell: districts of Ober- and Unterporta
Calven: districts of Obercalven (Münstertal) and Untercalven (Upper Vinschgau)
Domleschg: districts of Ortenstein (since 1788 divided into: Ortenstein im Boden and Ortenstein im Berg) and Fürstenau
Greifenstein: districts of Bergün and Obervaz
Oberengadin: (divided since 1438) districts of Sur and Suot Funtauna Merla
Oberhalbstein: districts of Oberhalbstein and Tiefencastel
Poschiavo
Ramosch-Stalla-Avers: districts of Ramosch and Stalla (Bivio)–Avers
Unterengadin: districts of Ober- and Untertasna
Vier Dörfer

Grey League

The Grey League was founded in 1395 in the Upper Rhine valley, as a reaction to various feuds between the Barony of Belmont, the Lordship of Sax, the Barony of Rhäzüns, the Barony of Vaz, County of Werdenberg, Disentis Abbey and the Bishopric of Chur. The capital of the League was Ilanz. The name Grey League is derived from the homespun grey clothes worn by the people; the name of this league later gave its name to the canton of Graubünden.

In Trun, on 16 March 1424, a governing federation was established, comprising:
 The abbot and court of Disentis Abbey;
 The Baron of Rhäzüns — for himself, his lordship and his subject communities of Safien, Tenna and Obersaxen;
 The Baron of Sax-Misox — for himself and his subjects Ilanz, Gruob, Lugnez, Vals, Castrisch and Flims;
 The Count of Werdenberg-Heiligenberg with all his subjects, including Trin and Tamins;
 Communities above the Flimserwald, including Rheinwald and Schams.

Even before 1440, the lordships of Löwenberg, Thusis, Tschappina and Heinzenberg joined the League, despite the count of Werdenberg-Sargans having forbidden them from doing so. In 1441 Cazis Abbey joined; in 1480, the neighborhoods of Mesocco and Soazza in Misox and, in 1496, Gian Giacomo Trivulzio assisted with the union of the remainder of the county of Misox, with the districts of Misox and Calanca.

The Grey League was administered in eight districts:
Disentis
Lugnez: districts of Lugnez and Vals
Gruob: districts of Gruob, Schleuis and Tenna
Waltensburg: districts of Waltensburg, Laax and Obersaxen
Rhäzüns: districts of Rhäzüns, Hohentrins and Flims
Schams-Rheinwald: districts of Rheinwald and Schams
Thusis: districts of Thusis, Heinzenberg, Tschappina and Safien
Misox: districts of Misox, Roveredo and Calanca

League of the Ten Jurisdictions

A third league was established on 8 June 1436, by the people of ten bailiwicks in the former county of Toggenburg, as the dynasty of Toggenburg had become extinct. The league was called League of the Ten Jurisdictions, with its capital in Davos, and was composed of:
 Belfort
 Davos
 Klosters
 Castels (now part of St. Antönien)
 Schiers
 Schanfigg (St. Peter)
 Langwies
 Strassberg (Churwalden)
 Maienfeld (the town and the castle)
 Neu-Aspermont (which had jurisdiction over Jenins and Malans)

The alliance was mainly designed to resist Habsburg expansion into the region and was administered in seven districts:
Davos
Klosters: districts of Klosters-Innerschnitz and Klosters-Ausserschnitz
Castels: (partitioned from 1622) districts of Luzein and Jenaz
Schiers-Seewis: (partitioned from 1679) districts of Schiers and Seewis
Maienfeld: districts of Maienfeld and Malans
Belfort: districts of Churwalden and (partitioned from 1613) Inner- and Ausserbelfort
Schanfigg: districts of St. Peter (Ausserschanfigg) and Langwies

Union of the leagues

The three separate Leagues initially worked together informally, such as in 1450, in the Schamserfehde, a conflict with the house of Werdenberg-Sargans, during which the League of the Ten Jurisdictions allied with the League of God's House. Joint meetings of the three Leagues are evidenced from 1461; closer links date to 1471, when the two leagues allied with the Grey League, but there is no documentary proof of this date. In 1497 and 1498 the Leagues allied with the Old Swiss Confederacy after the Habsburgs acquired the possessions of the extinct Toggenburg dynasty in 1496, siding with the Confederacy in the Swabian War three years later. The Habsburgs were defeated at Calven Gorge and Dornach, helping the Swiss Confederacy and the allied Leagues to be recognised.

After 1499, the Free State de facto separated from the Holy Roman Empire and developed, during the 16th century into a political entity that was unique in early modern Europe. In the early 17th century, it was the only territory in Europe where all decisions were made by communalism, with the Leagues founded, governed and defended by cooperative decisions.

The Musso war of 1520 drove the Three Leagues closer to the Swiss Confederacy.

The supreme power in the Free State was a Bundestag, composed of 63 deputies with responsible to constituencies; this Bundestag alternated between Ilanz, Chur and Davos. By today's standards, the Three Leagues would be considered a federation of three states, rather than a single, unified state; the union had few competencies and virtually all affairs of the Free State were settled by referendum.

The Ilanz Articles of 1524 and 1526 reduced the power of the Bishop of Chur and strengthened the alliance between the Three Leagues. The first articles, adopted 4 April 1524, required priests to live in the communities they served, to earnestly care for the spiritual needs of their congregation and to live a righteous life.  The communities had the right to approve their priests and restricted the bishop from judging secular matters. The second articles were adopted on 25 June 1526. They completely removed the bishop's secular power. The parishes could now chose their own priests and appointments to bishop required approval of the entire Bundestag.  Additionally church leaders could no longer appoint secular officers, the monasteries were placed under government oversight and various tithes were abolished or reduced.  The articles remained the law of League until the 1798 French invasion.  With the articles, the secular League authorities became the highest power in the region.

With the invasion of Switzerland by the French Revolutionary Armies, the Three Leagues were absorbed into the Helvetic Republic, as the canton of Raetia. With the Napoleonic Act of Mediation, the Leagues were incorporated into a restored Swiss Confederacy — as the canton of Graubünden — in 1803; the current constitution of the canton dates from 1892.

The districts of Chiavenna, Valtellina and Bormio, previously dependencies of the Leagues, were never a part of the canton of Raetia, however, having permanently been detached from the Leagues after Revolutionary France fomented revolt there, leading them to be annexed to the Cisalpine Republic on 10 October 1797. The districts subsequently joined the Austrian client kingdom of Lombardy–Venetia after the Congress of Vienna and eventually become the Italian province of Sondrio. The town of Campione was similarly detached from the Landvogtei of Lugano at the same time, leading to its current position as an Italian enclave within Ticino.

References

External links

Associates of the Old Swiss Confederacy
History of Graubünden
Grisons
States and territories established in 1450
States and territories disestablished in 1798
15th-century establishments in the Old Swiss Confederacy
18th-century disestablishments in the Old Swiss Confederacy
1450 establishments in Europe
1450s establishments in the Holy Roman Empire
15th-century establishments in Switzerland
1798 disestablishments in Europe
18th-century disestablishments in Switzerland
Former countries
Former confederations